Professor emeritus Hugh Stretton  (15 July 1924 – 18 July 2015) was an Australian historian who wrote books on politics, urban planning and economics, and a Rhodes Scholar. He was a key figure in the development and implementation of government policies affecting cities, particularly during the Whitlam Government.

Early life
Stretton was born in Cambrai Private Hospital, St Kilda East, son of Victorian judge Len Stretton. He was educated at Mentone Grammar School and Scotch College, Melbourne for his secondary school years. He subsequently enrolled at the University of Melbourne for his undergraduate education. However, the ongoing Second World War interrupted his studies and he served in the Royal Australian Navy. He enlisted as a rating on 5 May 1943 having declined a commission. Stretton was posted to numerous supply depots and ships throughout his service, including HMAS Penguin in Sydney and two corvettes based out of Darwin. As a result of his, he did not complete his studies at Melbourne.

Upon his demobilisation on 8 February 1946, he successfully enrolled as a Rhodes Scholar to study history at the University of Oxford. His application was supported by Sir Robert Menzies who wrote highly of him.

Career
He graduated Oxford with a Bachelor of Arts in 1948 and became a fellow in history at Balliol College. During this time, he also spent a year tutoring and reading history at Princeton University.

Stretton remained at the College until he took up a position as Professor of History at the University of Adelaide in 1954, becoming the youngest professor in Australia at the time. He stepped down from this position in 1968 and was appointed Visiting Research Fellow with the University's Department of Economics. Upon his retirement from the University in 1989, he was awarded both with the title of emeritus professor of history and an honorary doctorate.

He taught modern history and economics but wrote chiefly about town planning, housing policies, and social scientists' ways of explaining complex historical processes. He served as the deputy chair of the South Australian Housing Trust for 17 years at the behest of then-South Australian Premier Don Dunstan.

Influences and ideas
Stretton published several books on a wide range of topics. His first, The Political Sciences, was published in 1969 during his tenure as a Visiting Research Fellow at the Australian National University. He put forward ideas on the importance of urban development for the economic development of Australia which were heavily influenced by his study and personal experience of the National Capital Development Commission.

His 1976 book "Capitalism, Socialism and the Environment" is regarded as a pioneering effort in the then-new field of environmental sociology. It was one of the first to consider the societal implications of ecological limits.

Ideas for Australian Cities
One of Stretton's first and best-known works, Ideas for Australian Cities, was privately published in 1970. It was widely-read and stirred considerable interest in the ideas that he presented.

Stretton argued that the Australian suburb, much denigrated among professional architects and planners, was preferable to the agglomeration of large metropolises. He stressed its social benefits and smaller scale for creating a sense of community. He sought to approach urban issues from a historical and sociological perspective rather than a purely modernist or technical focus. He postulated that diversity of people within a city was essential for a successful living environment. However, he did not consider that increasing density was the best way to achieve this goal due to the loss of vegetation and social cohesion that he considered important.

Because of his background in sociology and history, he was an early modern advocate of concepts now considered part of post-modernist planning methods. This included social considerations such as planning for children and encounter. He was able to tie in these ideas with his main contentions on the advantages of suburbs to health and wellbeing.

At the time of the book's publication Australia was undergoing significant social and political change, culminating in the election of the socially-progressive Gough Whitlam as Prime Minister of Australia in 1972. Stretton was employed as a consultant to both state and federal governments over the period of the Whitlam Government's term and eventually worked with the newly established Department of Urban and Regional Development. This allowed him to have a significant impact on urban policies of the Whitlam Government over the course of his term in office.

Legacy
Hugh Stretton died after a long illness 18 July 2015, aged 91. His passing was mourned in many Australian newspapers, academic journals and other publications, with the Sydney Morning Herald calling him "one of Australia's leading public intellectuals".

His work had a profound effect on discourse in Australia across many different fields. His writing, activism and teaching are credited with raising important contemporary issues and leading important public debates across many decades. Stretton's willingness to assist both state and federal governments with policy development in a wide range of roles brought many of his ideas into the mainstream thinking and actions of bureaucracies throughout recent Australian history.

The Stretton Centre was established by the University of Adelaide in 2014 and the Government of South Australia as an institute to integrate industry, workplace and urban development.

Honours
Hugh Stretton was awarded the Centenary Medal in 2001, "for long service to the public housing sector".

In the Queen's Birthday Honours on 2004, Hugh Stretton was appointed a Companion of the Order of Australia (AC), at the time the highest honour within the Order of Australia. The citation reads "For service as a historian, social commentator and writer profoundly influencing and shaping ideas in the community on urban policy, town planning, and social and economic development".

In 2006, he was voted one of Australia's ten most influential public intellectuals

A portrait of Hugh Stretton by Australian artist Robert Hannaford won the Peoples Choice Award in the 1991 Archibald Prize.

References

External links
ASSA biography
Obituaries Australia

1924 births
2015 deaths
Australian historians
Companions of the Order of Australia
Recipients of the Centenary Medal
University of Melbourne alumni
People educated at Scotch College, Melbourne
Australian Rhodes Scholars
Princeton University alumni
Alumni of the University of Oxford
Urban theorists
Writers from Melbourne
Royal Australian Navy personnel of World War II
Military personnel from Melbourne
People from St Kilda, Victoria